Apoldu de Jos is a commune located in Sibiu County, Transylvania, Romania. It is composed of two villages, Apoldu de Jos and Sângătin (Kleinenyed; Kisenyed).

The municipality Apoldu de Jos is located in the historic Unterwald in the southwest of the Transylvanian Basin.

History 
Apoldu de Jos was founded by Transylvanian Saxons and first documented in 1289. According to J. M. Ackner, C. Goos and V. Christescu, archaeological finds suggesting a colonization in Roman times were made in the area of Apoldu de Jos - called by the locals Intre Apoalde and La Rodeni.

In 1750, 1236 Romanians lived in Kleinpold,  in 1773  about 60 landlords from Austria settled in Kleinpold. The inhabitants are engaged in mainly agriculture and livestock.

Population 
The highest number of Hungarians (84) and Roma (165) was registered in 1850. In 2002, 1525 people lived in the municipality of Apoldu de Jos, of which 17 were Roma, two Germans, one Hungarian, and the rest were Romanians.

Attractions 
• The wooden church Sf. Ioan Evanghelistul -  built in Apoldu de Jos (from Ocna Sibiului) in 1771 and renewed in 1881..

• The wooden church Sf. Arhangheli - built in Sângătin in 1687.

References 

Communes in Sibiu County
Localities in Transylvania